The men's 2500 metres steeplechase was a track & field athletics event at the 1900 Summer Olympics in Paris. It was the first time that a steeplechase race was held at the Olympics. The race was held on July 15, 1900, on a 500-metre track. Six athletes from six nations competed in the shorter of the two steeplechase events. The 4000 metre steeplechase race was held one day later. The event was won by George Orton of Canada, the nation's first gold medal in athletics. Sidney Robinson of Great Britain took silver, while Jean Chastanié of France earned bronze.

Background

This was the first Olympic steeplechase race, and the only time that an Olympic steeplechase race was held over the distance of 2500 metres. The 1900 Games introduced steeplechase events with this competition and the 4000 metres steeplechase. The next two Games would each feature a steeplechase, but at different distances: 2590 metres in 1904 and 3200 metres in 1908. There was no steeplechase event in 1912. After World War I, the now-standard 3000 metres steeplechase was introduced and has been held at every Games since. Women's steeplechase, also at 3000 metres, was added in 2008.

Most of the American team did not compete due to the event being scheduled on a Sunday.

Competition format

This steeplechase event featured a single race. The competition involved five laps of the 500 metre track, complete with standard hurdles as well as stone fences and a water jump.

Records

None, this was the first time the event was held. And it was the only time a steeplechase race was held over 2500 metres.

Schedule

Results

Robinson and Chastanié were the two leaders for most of the race, with Newton and Orton behind them. Orton had been in fourth place for most of the race, ahead of only Wraschtil and Duhne who had dropped behind the other four runners. Orton passed the three leaders in the final straight of the fifth lap.

References

Sources
 International Olympic Committee.
 De Wael, Herman. Herman's Full Olympians: "Athletics 1900". Accessed 18 March 2006.
 

Men's steeplechase 2500 metres
Steeplechase at the Olympics